The 2016–17 season was Torino Football Club's 106th season of competitive football, 89th season in the top division of Italian football and 72nd season in Serie A. The club competed in Serie A and in the Coppa Italia.

In the league Torino enjoyed a mixed campaign, finishing 9th with 53 points but scoring 71 goals, including 26 from Italian striker Andrea Belotti, who finished three goals below capocannoniere and Roma striker Edin Džeko. The season was also the first in charge of Torino for Serbian coach and former player Siniša Mihajlović.

Players

Squad information

Transfers

In

Loans in

Out

Loans out

Pre-season and friendlies

Competitions

Overall

Last updated: 28 May 2017

Serie A

League table

Results summary

Results by round

Matches

Coppa Italia

Statistics

Appearances and goals

|-
! colspan=14 style=background:#dcdcdc; text-align:center| Goalkeepers

|-
! colspan=14 style=background:#dcdcdc; text-align:center| Defenders

|-
! colspan=14 style=background:#dcdcdc; text-align:center| Midfielders

|-
! colspan=14 style=background:#dcdcdc; text-align:center| Forwards

|-
! colspan=14 style=background:#dcdcdc; text-align:center| Players transferred out during the season

Goalscorers

Last updated: 28 May 2017

Clean sheets

Last updated: 28 May 2017

Disciplinary record

Last updated: 28 May 2017

References

Torino F.C. seasons
Torino